William Peter Sprague (May 21, 1827 – March 3, 1899) was a businessman, banker, politician, and a two-term U.S. Representative from Ohio, serving from 1871 to 1875.

Biography 
Sprague was born near Malta in Morgan County, Ohio, and attended the country schools. He engaged in mercantile pursuits when quite young and continued in active business until 1864.

He was a member of the Ohio Senate from 1860 to 1863 during the American Civil War. He moved to McConnelsville, Ohio, in 1866 and engaged in banking. He was elected as a Republican to the Forty-second and Forty-third Congresses (March 4, 1871 – March 3, 1875). Sprague was not a candidate for renomination in 1874 and subsequently resumed the banking business in Malta.

He died in McConnelsville and was buried in Riverview Cemetery.

References

External links

1827 births
1899 deaths
People from Malta, Ohio
Republican Party Ohio state senators
19th-century American politicians
People from McConnelsville, Ohio
Republican Party members of the United States House of Representatives from Ohio